Maksim Plotnikov (born 29 January 1998) is a Belarusian professional footballer who plays for Caspiy.

Honours
Shakhtyor Soligorsk
Belarusian Premier League champion: 2022

References

External links 
 
 

1998 births
Living people
Sportspeople from Pinsk
Belarusian footballers
Association football goalkeepers
Belarus international footballers
Belarusian expatriate footballers
Expatriate footballers in Kazakhstan
FC Dinamo Minsk players
FC Luch Minsk (2012) players
FC Torpedo-BelAZ Zhodino players
FC Shakhtyor Soligorsk players
FC Caspiy players